Brush Creek Salems Church, now known as Irwin Brush Creek Salem United Church of Christ, is a historic Reformed church building located in Hempfield Township, Westmoreland County, Pennsylvania. It was built between 1816 and 1820, and is a two-story, brick building with a gable roof. The interior features a second floor gallery.  A connected gable roofed, one-story addition was built in 1958.

It was added to the National Register of Historic Places in 1987.

References

Churches completed in 1820
19th-century churches in the United States
Churches on the National Register of Historic Places in Pennsylvania
Churches in Westmoreland County, Pennsylvania
United Church of Christ churches in Pennsylvania
National Register of Historic Places in Westmoreland County, Pennsylvania
1820 establishments in Pennsylvania